Eladio "Black Bill" Valdés (July 1905 – May 14, 1933) was a Cuban boxer of the 1920s.

Small of stature at 5 feet, 3.5 inches and weighing between 109–115 pounds, he was managed by Luis "Pincho" Gutiérrez and trained by Moe Fleischer. He made his first official appearance on September 11, 1920 (at age 15) in a fight in Havana, his native city, where he defeated Diego Blanco in the fourth round.

Valdés continued to fight throughout the 1920s, dividing his fights between Havana and New York City. Although he was neither large nor a power hitter, he was known for throwing opponents off guard by attacking with agility and angled punches.

Cuban flyweight and light flyweight champion, 1921-3
On November 6, 1921, he was proclaimed Cuban Flyweight Champion after his defeat of Dixie Lewis, and presented with a belt that month. On May 7, 1923, in Havana, he defeated Genaro Pino for the Light Flyweight Championship of Cuba in 12 rounds.

Challenging for the world flyweight championship, 1930
On March 21, 1930, he unsuccessfully challenged Midget Wolgast for the New York State Athletic Commission's version of the World Flyweight Title at Madison Square Garden.

During his career, he defeated opponents such as Johnny McCoy, Willie Davies, "Corporal" Izzy Schwartz, Sammy Bienfield, the French boxer Eugène Huat, Happy Atherton, Genaro Pino, Marty Gold, Bobby Green, Henry Catena, Pinky Silverberg, and Benny Marks.
Plagued by alcoholism and boxing-related blindness, Valdés committed suicide while in Harlem, New York, on May 14, 1933.

Professional boxing record
All information in this section is derived from BoxRec, unless otherwise stated.

Official record

All newspaper decisions are officially regarded as “no decision” bouts and are not counted in the win/loss/draw column.

Unofficial record

Record with the inclusion of newspaper decisions in the win/loss/draw column.

References

External links
 Profile at Cyber boxing zone
 Photograph of Valdés with Kid Chocolate, from the Cuban Photograph Collection of the University of Miami Libraries Cuban Heritage Collection.

People from Havana
1905 births
1933 deaths
Cuban male boxers
Flyweight boxers
1933 suicides
Suicides in New York City
20th-century Cuban people